Robion Cromwell Kirby (born February 25, 1938) is a Professor of Mathematics at the University of California, Berkeley who specializes in low-dimensional topology. Together with Laurent C. Siebenmann he developed the Kirby–Siebenmann invariant for classifying the piecewise linear structures on a topological manifold. He also proved the fundamental result on the Kirby calculus, a method for describing 3-manifolds and smooth 4-manifolds by surgery on framed links. Along with his significant mathematical contributions, he has over 50 doctoral students and his problem list.

He received his Ph.D. from the University of Chicago in 1965.  He soon became an assistant professor at UCLA. While there he developed his "torus trick" which enabled him to solve, in dimensions greater than four (with additional joint work with Siebenmann), four of John Milnor's seven most important problems in geometric topology.

In 1971, he was awarded the Oswald Veblen Prize in Geometry by the American Mathematical Society.

In 1995 he became the first mathematician to receive the NAS Award for Scientific Reviewing from the National Academy of Sciences for his problem list in low-dimensional topology. He was elected to the National Academy of Sciences in 2001.  In 2012 he became a fellow of the American Mathematical Society.

Kirby is also the President of Mathematical Sciences Publishers, a small non-profit academic publishing house that focuses on mathematics and engineering journals.

Books

References

External links
Kirby's home page.
Kirby's list of problems in low dimensional topology. (This is a large 380 page gzipped ps file.)
Biographical notes from the Proceedings of the Kirbyfest in honour of his 60th birthday in 1998.

  Video Lectures by Kirby at Edinburgh

1938 births
Members of the United States National Academy of Sciences
20th-century American mathematicians
21st-century American mathematicians
Topologists
Living people
University of Chicago alumni
University of California, Los Angeles faculty
University of California, Berkeley College of Letters and Science faculty
Fellows of the American Mathematical Society
Mathematicians from Illinois
Scientists from Chicago